The Eindhoven Marathon (Dutch: Marathon Eindhoven) is an annual marathon race over the classic distance of 42.195km which is held in the city of Eindhoven, The Netherlands in October. It has been an annual race since 1990 – it was held biennially over the eight years before this date.

Dickson Kiptolo Chumba and Georgina Rono are the men's and women's course record holders with times of 2:05:46 and 2:24:33 hours, respectively.

Past winners
Key:

References

 Past winners from ARRS

External links 

 Official website
 Marathon info

Marathons in the Netherlands
Sports competitions in Eindhoven
Recurring sporting events established in 1959
1959 establishments in the Netherlands
Autumn events in the Netherlands